Felicity Colman is a Creative Media Arts theorist. She is Professor of Film and Media Arts. She is the Associate Dean of Research for the London College of Fashion (from 2019) at University of the Arts London

Colman was the Head of The Graduate Research School (2017-2019) at Kingston University, London, United Kingdom. Colman held a Professorial Chair in Media at Manchester School of Art, Manchester, United Kingdom. where she held various positions in art and media at the Manchester School of Art from 2009-2017. Prior to this Colman held a number of positions at University of Melbourne, Melbourne, Australia.

Colman is Honorary Professor at the School of Art, College of Design and Social Context RMIT, Melbourne, Australia (2019-2023). From 2020 Colman is Visiting Research Fellow, Global Centre for Humanities in Technology [GCTH], Kyung Hee University, South Korea. In 2005 Colman was Visiting Associate Professor in Screen Media, Screen Theory Department, The University of Waikato, New Zealand. In 2001, Colman was Smithsonian Research Scholar, at the National Gallery of Art Washington DC, USA.

Colman's specialities include visual art, culture, and screen media forms, and creative philosophy.

Academic work 

 Colman, F., Bühlmann, V., O’Donnell, A. and van der Tuin, I. (2018). Ethics of Coding: A Report on the Algorithmic Condition [EoC]. H2020-EU.2.1.1. – INDUSTRIAL LEADERSHIP – Leadership in enabling and industrial technologies – Information and Communication Technologies. Brussels: European Commission. 732407, pp. 1–54.

References 

1967 births
Living people
Academic staff of the University of Melbourne
Academics of Kingston University
University of Sydney alumni
University of Queensland alumni
Monash University alumni
University of Melbourne alumni
University of Melbourne women
Feminist artists
Academics of the London College of Fashion